Sir William Gorman (15 October 1891 – 21 December 1964) was an English barrister, judge and Liberal Party politician.

Family and education
Gorman was born in Wigan in Lancashire, the son of William Gorman, a shopkeeper in Wigan, and Catherine Jump. He was the grandson of Henry Gorman, also a Wigan shopkeeper, who was born in Tipperary, Ireland in 1825. He was educated at Wigan Grammar School. He never married.

Career
Gorman went in for the law and was called to the Bar at the Middle Temple in 1921. He took silk in 1932. He practised on the Northern Circuit and was elected a Bencher of the Middle Temple in 1938, acting as its treasurer in 1959. He was made a judge in 1934, serving as Recorder of Wigan from 1934 to 1948 and was Recorder of Liverpool from 1948 to 1950. In 1950 he was appointed a Judge of the High Court of Justice, King's Bench Division. As Mr Justice Gorman, he was the judge who presided over the infamous A6 Murder trial, the longest murder trial in modern times, at which James Hanratty was convicted. Hanratty was later hanged for the murder.

During the Second World War, Gorman served in the Royal Artillery, 7th Division, in France, Belgium and Italy. He also served in the Royal Air Force Volunteer Reserve from 1940 to 1944, leaving with the rank of wing commander. From 1942 to 1944 he held the position of Assistant Judge Advocate General.

Politics

1922

Gorman first tried to enter the House of Commons at the 1922 general election when he fought Royton as a Liberal. In a three-cornered contest he was 1,093 votes behind the sitting Conservative MP, Sir Wilfrid Sugden. The Labour candidate Mr J Battle came third with just under 20% of the poll, giving Gorman hope that in a straight fight he might win the seat at a future attempt.

1923

In 1923 Gorman again fought Royton and there was again a three-cornered contest. This time however the effects of Liberal reunion between the Lloyd George and Asquithian wings of the Liberal Party gave him a valuable boost and he overtook Sugden to capture the seat with a majority of 2,516 votes. Labour again came bottom of the poll, their candidate the Rev. J B Turner, losing his deposit.

1924

Labour refused to concede Gorman a straight fight against the Tories in 1924 either. Their candidate, Mr A E Wood, duly came bottom of the poll again but raised his party's share of the vote to 19%. With the anti-Tory vote thus split again and the Conservatives resurgent in the country after the brief period of the first Labour government, their new candidate Arthur Davies, defeated Gorman by a majority 2,426. Gorman did not stand for Parliament again.

Gorman retained his association with Liberal politics however and was elected President of the Oldham Reform Club in 1925.

Honours
Gorman was knighted in 1950. He served as President of Caterham School in Surrey from 1953. He was made an Honorary Freeman of Wigan in 1954  and received the Honorary degree of Doctor of Laws from the University of Manchester in 1957.

Other appointments
In 1944, Gorman was appointed by the Ernest Bevin, the Minister of Labour and National Service to sit on the National Arbitration Tribunal, a body established to resolve labour disputes under wartime restrictions on strikes and lockouts. He also served on the Industrial and Staff Canteen Undertakings Wages Board, set to consider wage claims under the Catering Wages Act 1943.

Death
Gorman died in the West London Hospital on 21 December 1964  aged 73 years. A memorial service was held for him in the Temple Church on 11 February 1965 attended by senior members of the judiciary and the legal profession.

References

1891 births
1964 deaths
Military personnel from Lancashire
Royal Air Force officers
English barristers
English King's Counsel
20th-century King's Counsel
Members of the Middle Temple
Queen's Bench Division judges
Royal Artillery personnel
Royal Air Force Volunteer Reserve personnel of World War II
UK MPs 1923–1924
Knights Bachelor
Liberal Party (UK) MPs for English constituencies
People from Wigan
Politics of Lancashire
20th-century English lawyers
British Army personnel of World War II
Royal Air Force wing commanders